Phosphorus pentaiodide is an inorganic compound with formula PI5.  The existence of this compound has been claimed intermittently since the early 1900s.  The claim is disputed: "The pentaiodide does not exist (except perhaps as PI3·I2, but certainly not as ...)".

References 

Hypothetical chemical compounds
Phosphorus(V) compounds
Phosphorus iodides